Iosyp Hamskiy (born 20 October 1949) is a Ukrainian athlete. He competed in the men's hammer throw at the 1972 Summer Olympics, representing the Soviet Union.

References

1949 births
Living people
Athletes (track and field) at the 1972 Summer Olympics
Ukrainian male hammer throwers
Olympic athletes of the Soviet Union
Sportspeople from Lviv
Soviet male hammer throwers